Genius is an American anthology period drama television series developed by Noah Pink and Kenneth Biller which premiered on National Geographic. The first season, which aired between April and June 2017, followed the life of Albert Einstein, from his early years, through his time as a patent clerk, and into his later years as a physicist who developed the theory of relativity; the season is based on the 2007 book Einstein: His Life and Universe by Walter Isaacson. The second season, which aired between April and June 2018, followed the life and artistry of Pablo Picasso.

In April 2018, National Geographic renewed the series for a third season. The season was originally supposed to focus on Mary Shelley, but this was changed during development to instead focus on Aretha Franklin. It aired in March 2021. In December 2020, the series was renewed for a fourth season, which is set to be released on Disney+. The series will follow the lives of Martin Luther King Jr. and Malcolm X.

Synopsis
The first season chronicles two periods in the life of Albert Einstein: the first as a patent clerk struggling to gain a teaching position and doctorate, the second as a scientist respected for his development of the theory of relativity.

The second season chronicles two periods in the life of Pablo Picasso: the first as a young man first discovering his talent, the second as a celebrated artist struggling with the rise of fascism and the price of fame.

The third season chronicles two periods in the life of Aretha Franklin: as a young gospel singer impregnated at the age of twelve, and as a rising star who was crowned the "Queen of Soul".

Cast and characters

Season 1

Main

Recurring

Season 2

Main

Recurring

Season 3

Main

Recurring

Season 4

Main

Recurring

Episodes

Season 1: Einstein (2017)

Season 2: Picasso (2018)

Season 3: Aretha (2021)

Production

Development
On April 28, 2016, it was announced that National Geographic had given the production a straight-to-series order, its first ever scripted series. The series was set to be based on the biography Einstein: His Life and Universe by Walter Isaacson and adapted by Noah Pink, who was also expected to co-executive produce. Executive producers were announced to include Brian Grazer, Ron Howard, Francie Calfo, Gigi Pritzker, Rachel Shane, Sam Sokolow, and Jeffrey Cooney. Anna Culp was set to co-produce alongside Melissa Rucker. Ron Howard was expected to direct the first episode of the series. Production companies involved with the series were set to include Imagine TV, Fox 21 TV Studios, OddLot Entertainment and EUE/Sokolow.

On April 19, 2017, National Geographic renewed the series for a second season. The subject of the second season was to have been announced during the finale of the first season, but was instead revealed to be Pablo Picasso the day after the finale, when the network and producers did not want to divert attention away from the season finale. The second season premiered on April 24, 2018.

On April 18, 2018, National Geographic renewed the series for a third season. The season was initially set to follow the life of writer Mary Shelley. Ken Biller is expected to return as showrunner, executive producer and writer. Also returning are executive producers Brian Grazer, Ron Howard, Francie Calfo, Jeff Cooney, Sam Sokolow, Gigi Pritzker, and Rachel Shane. Anna Culp will return as producer. Returning production companies include Imagine TV, MWM Studios, and EUE/Sokolow. On February 10, 2019, it was announced that the subject of the third season would instead be American singer Aretha Franklin, known as "The Queen of Soul". The third season was slated to premiere on May 25, 2020 and air over four consecutive nights, but was delayed due to the coronavirus pandemic and began airing on March 21, 2021.

On December 10, 2020, the series was renewed for a fourth season, which is set to follow the life of Martin Luther King Jr. and will be moving to Disney+.

Casting

Season 1
In August 2016, it was announced that Geoffrey Rush and Johnny Flynn would star in the series as Albert Einstein both as an old man and as a young adult, respectively. Additionally, it was reported that Emily Watson would also star in the series and that Michael McElhatton, Seth Gabel, Samantha Colley, Richard Topol, and Vincent Kartheiser had joined the cast. In November 2016, it was announced that Shannon Tarbet, Claire Rushbrook, and Robert Lindsay had been cast in recurring roles. On February 2, 2017, it was reported that T. R. Knight had been cast in the recurring role of J. Edgar Hoover.

Season 2
On September 6, 2017, it was announced that Antonio Banderas would star in the second season as Pablo Picasso. On November 2, 2017, it was reported that Alex Rich would co-star in the series sharing the lead role of Picasso. It was further reported that Clémence Poésy, Robert Sheehan, Poppy Delevingne, Aisling Franciosi, and Sebastian Roché also joined the cast and that Samantha Colley, T. R. Knight, Seth Gabel, and Johnny Flynn were returning from season one in new roles.

Season 3
On October 3, 2019, Cynthia Erivo was cast to play Aretha Franklin.

Season 4
In September 2022, the cast was announced, with Kelvin Harrison Jr. and Aaron Pierre set to star as Martin Luther King Jr. and Malcolm X respectively, while Weruche Opia was cast as Coretta Scott King and Jayme Lawson as Betty Shabazz. In November, Ron Cephas Jones, Gary Carr and Hubert Point-Du Jour were added to the main cast for the season, with Lennie James, LisaGay Hamilton, Ashley Romans, Donal Logue and Griffin Matthews joining in recurring roles. Jalyn Hall was cast as a younger Martin Luther King Jr. in December.

Filming
Principal photography for season one took place in mid-2016 in Prague. Filming for season two began in November 2017 in Málaga and was expected to take place for over five months in various cities around the world, including Barcelona, Paris, and Budapest. Filming for the third season was set to commence in November 2019, for an early-2020 release. In March 2020, the production was shelved due to the COVID-19 pandemic. The series resumed production on October 1, 2020.

Music
Most of Franklin's music in season three was recorded by Erivo. The producers, however, were unable to obtain the rights to use Franklin's biggest songs, "Respect" and "(You Make Me Feel Like) A Natural Woman".

Reception

Critical reception

Season 1
The first season received mostly positive reviews. On review aggregator website Rotten Tomatoes, the series has an approval rating of 83%, based on 29 reviews. The website's critical consensus reads, "Buoyed by a superb performance from Geoffrey Rush, Genius is a compelling origin story of one of history's most renowned scientists." On Metacritic, the season had a score of 65 out of 100, based on 20 reviews, indicating "generally favorable reviews".

Science columnist Dennis Overbye of The New York Times described the series as a "tense binge-worthy psychological thriller full of political and romantic melodrama." Overbye further noted that Einstein himself, writing to his sister, wrote, "If everybody lived a life like mine, there would be no need for novels." According to Hillary Busis of Vanity Fair, the film shows, "... Einstein at work ... peers into the über-genius's tumultuous love life (monogamy, he believes, is "not natural") ... his fraught emigration to the United States ...". Busis quotes producer Ron Howard: "When you move past his scientific contributions, Albert's life story—what his youth was like, who his friends were, who his enemies were, his tumultuous love life—is a story people don't know ... I think audiences are going to be riveted as we tell this ambitious and revealing human story behind Einstein's scientific brilliance."

Season 2
The second season received mixed reviews, but garnered praise for its star, Antonio Banderas. Rotten Tomatoes gave an approval rating of 59%, based on 17 reviews. Its critical consensus reads: "An impressive performance from Antonio Banderas rescues Genius: Picasso from condensed melodrama." On Metacritic, the season had a score of 52 out of 100, based on 10 reviews, indicating "mixed or average reviews".

Season 3
The third season received mainly positive reviews. Rotten Tomatoes gave an approval rating of 73% based on 26 reviews. The critical consensus reads: "Cynthia Erivo captures the spirit of the singular singer with poise and passion - if only Arethas writing were as strong as her performance." On Metacritic, the season had a score of 67 out of 100, based on 10 reviews, indicating "generally favorable reviews".

Reaction from Franklin's family
The family of Aretha Franklin did not react kindly to the season. They claim they were not consulted in any part of the production, despite the crew's insistence that they worked with Franklin's estate.

Accolades

See also

 Albert Einstein House
 Einstein family
 The Einstein Theory of Relativity
 Historical Museum of Bern
 History of gravitational theory
 Introduction to special relativity
 Political views of Albert Einstein
 Religious and philosophical views of Albert Einstein

References

External links
 
 Genius – official website 
 
 
 Works by Pablo Picasso at Google Images
 

2010s American anthology television series
2010s American documentary television series
2010s American drama television series
2017 American television series debuts
American biographical series
Aretha Franklin
Cultural depictions of Albert Einstein
Cultural depictions of Gertrude Stein
Cultural depictions of J. Edgar Hoover
Cultural depictions of Martin Luther King Jr.
Cultural depictions of Mileva Marić
Cultural depictions of Pablo Picasso
Disney+ original programming
English-language television shows
National Geographic (American TV channel) original programming
Science education television series
Television productions suspended due to the COVID-19 pandemic
Television series about geniuses
Television series by 20th Century Fox Television
Television series by Imagine Entertainment
Television shows filmed in France
Television shows filmed in Hungary
Television shows filmed in Spain
Television shows filmed in the Czech Republic
Television shows scored by Hans Zimmer
Television shows set in Berlin
Television shows set in Italy
Television shows set in Switzerland
Works about Martin Luther King Jr.
Works about Malcolm X
Works about Albert Einstein